Patrick Emeka Nwadike (born 29 August 1998) is a Swedish football defender who plays for IK Sirius.

References

1998 births
Living people
Swedish footballers
Association football defenders
Landskrona BoIS players
KSF Prespa Birlik players
IK Sirius Fotboll players
Ettan Fotboll players
Allsvenskan players